Asmodeus is a demon-like figure from the Book of Tobit.

Asmodeus or Ashmedai may also refer to:

Fictional characters 
 Asmodeus, a character in Le Diable boiteux; also an alternate title for the novel in English
 Asmodeus (Dungeons & Dragons), a Dungeons & Dragons devil
 Asmodeus (Marvel Comics), a Marvel Comics demon
 Asmodeus Poisonteeth, an antagonist in the novel Redwall
 Asmodeus, a character in the manga series Angel Sanctuary
 Asmodeus, an antagonist in the video game Star Ocean
 Asmodeus, an antagonist in the video game Mace: The Dark Age
 Asmodeus, a character in the webcomic Megatokyo
 Asmodeus, a character in the novel series The Magicians
 Alice Asmodeus, a character in the manga series Welcome to Demon School! Iruma-kun
 Asmodeus, a character in the television series Supernatural
 Asmodeus, a character in the web series Helluva Boss

Music 
 Asmodeus (band), an Austrian black metal band
 Asmodeus: Book of Angels Volume 7, a 2007 album by Marc Ribot and composed by John Zorn

Other uses 
 Asmodaios (newspaper), a 19th-century Greek satirical newspaper
 Asmodeus (mammal), a genus of notoungulates in the family Homalodotheriidae